Pseudacanthicus histrix is a large species of armored catfish endemic to Brazil where it occurs in the Rio Negro and lower Amazon basins. P. histrix has incredibly elongated odontodes that form a brush on the anterior margin of the pectoral fin spine in breeding males; however, sexual dimorphism has not been reported for the other Pseudacanthicus species.

References

Ancistrini
Fish of South America
Fish of Brazil
Endemic fauna of Brazil
Fish described in 1840